Liu Xiaomei (born 11 January 1972 in Neijiang) is a former Chinese track and field athlete who specialised in sprinting. After entering the Sichuan Track and Field Team in 1986, She competed in the women's 4 × 100 metres relay at the 2000 Summer Olympics.

She is the current Asian record holder in the 4 x 100 metres relay with a time of 42.23 seconds, achieved in October 1997 with Xiao Lin, Li Yali and Li Xuemei.

Personal bests

References

External links
All-Athletics profile for Liu Xiaomei

1972 births
Living people
Chinese female sprinters
Runners from Sichuan
People from Neijiang
Athletes (track and field) at the 2000 Summer Olympics
Olympic athletes of China
Asian Games medalists in athletics (track and field)
Asian Games gold medalists for China
Athletes (track and field) at the 1994 Asian Games
Medalists at the 1994 Asian Games
Olympic female sprinters
20th-century Chinese women